Bhogendra Jha (1923 – 20 January 2009) was an Indian politician belonging to the Communist party of India. He was elected to the Lok Sabha the lower house of Indian parliament from Madhubani , Bihar .

Bhogendra Jha joined the Communist Party of India in 1940 and steadfastly fought for land reforms standing by the side of the marginalised and deprived sections in the realm of agriculture. A former President of the All India Kisan Sabha, he was an excellent speaker and a lucid writer whose intellectual contributions in the fields of philosophy and literature cannot be overestimated. He was one of the undisputed leaders of the Bihar CPI which at one time was a citadel of the party in the Hindi heartland and even now happens to be an important base of the CPI.

References

External links
Official biographical sketch in Parliament of India website

1923 births
2009 deaths
Lok Sabha members from Bihar
India MPs 1967–1970
India MPs 1971–1977
India MPs 1980–1984
India MPs 1989–1991
India MPs 1991–1996
Communist Party of India politicians from Bihar